The Bahamas has participated at the World Championships in Athletics since its inception, and has sent athletes to compete in every World championship since then.

Medals by World Championships

References

 
Nations at the World Athletics Championships
Athletics in the Bahamas